Valøy Church is a chapel of the Church of Norway in Nærøysund municipality in Trøndelag county, Norway. It is located in the village of Valøya on the western coast of the island of Ytter-Vikna. It is an annex chapel for the Vikna parish which is part of the Namdal prosti (deanery) in the Diocese of Nidaros. The wooden chapel building is a former school building in Valøya. It was converted to a chapel in 1972 and the building was consecrated on 20 August 1972 by Bishop Tord Godal. The church seats about 150 people.

See also
List of churches in Nidaros

References

Nærøysund
Churches in Trøndelag
Long churches in Norway
Wooden churches in Norway
20th-century Church of Norway church buildings
Churches completed in 1972
1972 establishments in Norway